Ust-Shchuger (Čugör), formerly known as Ust-Shchugor, is a rural locality (a village) in the Komi Republic, Russia, located at an elevation of  near the confluence of the Pechora and Shchuger Rivers. The Shchugor River was once a minor route into Siberia. From its headwaters one could cross the Ural Mountains to reach the Severnaya Sosva River thereby allowing travel from the Pechora River to the Ob River.

Climate
Ust-Shchuger has a subarctic climate (Dfc) with mild to warm summers and severely cold winters. In spite of this, winter averages are less severe than areas on similar and lower latitudes further east across the Siberian boundary. Winters are very snowy due to a humid influence, causing a vast snow pack that lasts well into spring.

References

Sources

Rural localities in the Komi Republic